Cedar Rapids is a city in Iowa.

Cedar Rapids may also refer to:
 Cedar Rapids, Nebraska
 Cedar Rapids, Wisconsin
 Cedar Rapids metropolitan area, the metropolitan area of Cedar Rapids, Iowa
 Cedar Rapids (film), a 2011 comedy film